Kerri Einarson (born October 3, 1987 as Kerri Flett) is a Canadian Métis curler from Camp Morton, Manitoba, in the Rural Municipality of Gimli. Einarson is the four-time reigning women's national champion in curling, skipping her team to victory at the 2023 Scotties Tournament of Hearts, 
2022 Scotties Tournament of Hearts, 2021 Scotties Tournament of Hearts and the 2020 Scotties Tournament of Hearts. She previously won silver in 2018. She has also won two provincial mixed curling championships in 2010 and 2013. Einarson has won five Grand Slam of Curling events: the 2016 Boost National, 2019 Players' Championship, 2021 Players' Championship, 2022 Champions Cup, and 2022 Masters.

Career
Einarson won her first provincial mixed title in 2010, playing third for Dave Boehmer. The team represented Manitoba at the 2010 Canadian Mixed Curling Championship, where they lost in the tiebreaker match. At the 2013 provincial mixed (played in 2012), Einarson played third for Terry McNamee and won her second provincial mixed title. This team played in the 2013 Canadian Mixed Curling Championship, finishing with a 4–7 record.

Einarson has skipped her own team on the women's World Curling Tour since 2008, except for one season playing third for Jill Thurston in the 2011–12 season. The following season, she finished second at the 2012 Atkins Curling Supplies Women's Classic.

Einarson scored a rare eight-ender in her first round robin game of the 2015 Manitoba Scotties Tournament of Hearts against Tiffany McLean. It was the first time a team scored an eight-ender in recorded Manitoba Scotties history.

Einarson's first Tour event win as a skip was at the 2015 GSOC Tour Challenge, where she finished first in the tier 2 event and won a spot at the 2015 The Masters Grand Slam of Curling where she would lose to Val Sweeting in the semifinals. Einarson would make it to two more semifinals at Grand Slams that season. That year Einarson would also win her first provincial championship, qualifying her team of Selena Kaatz, Liz Fyfe and Kristin MacCuish to represent Manitoba at the 2016 Scotties Tournament of Hearts. There, she led her province to a 7–4 round robin record, qualifying the team to the playoffs. In the playoffs however, she would go on to lose both games, settling for fourth place.

The next season, Einarson won her first Grand Slam event, the 2016 Boost National. Her next tour event win was at the 2017 Icebreaker at The Granite. Two weeks later she won the 2017 GSOC Tour Challenge Tier 2 event. While she didn't win any more events that season, she made it to the finals in two Grand Slams, losing to Jennifer Jones at the 2017 Masters of Curling and to Rachel Homan at the 2018 Humpty's Champions Cup. Einarson's team had a disappointing showing at the 2017 Canadian Olympic Curling Pre-Trials, where she lost in a tiebreaker. However, her team amassed enough tour points over the season to play in the first ever Scotties Tournament of Hearts wildcard game against the higher ranked Chelsea Carey rink. Einarson beat Carey for the right to represent the new "Team Wildcard" at the 2018 Scotties Tournament of Hearts. There, she went on a roll, going 9–2 in round robin pool, to finish in a three-way tie for first. In the playoffs she lost to Jennifer Jones' team Manitoba in the 1 vs. 2 game, beat Nova Scotia in the semifinal, and then lost to Jones again in the final. Despite a successful season, the Einarson team would split up.

For the 2018–19 season, Einarson would form a new team of Val Sweeting, Shannon Birchard and Briane Meilleur, all former skips. They began the season by winning four straight World Curling Tour events in three weeks: the 2018 Stu Sells Oakville Tankard, the inaugural Morris SunSpiel, and the Mother Club Fall Curling Classic, and in October they won the Curlers Corner Autumn Gold Classic. In December, the team lost in the finals of the 2018 Canada Cup and 2018 National. Their strong play during the early part of the season earned them enough points to put Einarson in the Wild Card game once again at the 2019 Scotties Tournament of Hearts. However this time, she was not successful, losing to the lower ranked Casey Scheidegger rink. The team would rebound to have a strong finish at the end of the season, winning the 2019 Players' Championship and losing in the final of the 2019 Champions Cup.

Team Einarson had two playoff finishes at the first two Slams of the 2019–20 season, losing to Anna Hasselborg in the quarterfinal of the Masters and once again to Hasselborg in the final of the Tour Challenge. The team did not have the same success at the Canada Cup as they did in 2018, finishing with a 2–4 record. However, at the 2020 Manitoba Scotties Tournament of Hearts, her team succeeded. They finished the round robin and championship round with a 7–1 record which qualified them for the final. In the final, Einarson defeated Jennifer Jones to win her second Manitoba Scotties Tournament of Hearts. Team Einarson represented Manitoba at the 2020 Scotties Tournament of Hearts, where they continued their success. They finished first in the round robin with a 9–2 record and then won the 1 vs. 2 page playoff game, qualifying them for the final. Einarson would win her first Canadian Championship with a draw to the button for an 8–7 win against Rachel Homan. For her strong play through the week of the Scotties she was named the MVP of the tournament and was awarded the second team all-star as skip. The team was set to represent Canada at the 2020 World Women's Curling Championship before the event got cancelled due to the COVID-19 pandemic. The Scotties would be their last event of the season as both the Players' Championship and the Champions Cup Grand Slam events were also cancelled due to the pandemic.

Team Einarson returned to the Scotties Tournament of Hearts in 2021 as Team Canada, played in a "curling bubble" in Calgary, with no spectators, to avoid the spread of the coronavirus. They went 7–1 in the round robin, with their only loss coming against Ontario's Rachel Homan. This qualified them for the championship round. There, they won three games and lost one to Manitoba's Jennifer Jones. They advanced to the playoffs as the second seed, defeating Alberta's Laura Walker 9–3 in the semifinal. In the final, they defeated Homan to win their second consecutive Scotties gold. Einarson was named to the First Team All-Stars for the tournament, alongside teammates Shannon Birchard and Val Sweeting. A month later, and Einarson was back in the Calgary bubble to team up with Brad Gushue at the 2021 Canadian Mixed Doubles Curling Championship. It was her first time playing mixed doubles curling. After finishing pool play with a 5–1 record, the pair won five of six of their playoff matches, including the championship game against Kadriana Sahaidak and Colton Lott. Einarson returned to the bubble for a third time in April 2021, along with her women's team to play in the two only Grand Slam events of the abbreviated season. The team made it to the semifinals of the 2021 Champions Cup where they lost to Team Homan, but got their revenge at the 2021 Players' Championship a week later, where they beat Homan in the final. The following week, Einarson and her rink represented Canada at the 2021 World Women's Curling Championship. The team had a slow start to the event, falling to 1–5 after their first six games. They turned things around, however, winning six of their seven remaining round robin games to qualifying for the playoffs. They then faced Sweden's Anna Hasselborg in the qualification game, which they lost 8–3. Right after the World Championship, Einarson travelled to Aberdeen, Scotland to compete in the 2021 World Mixed Doubles Curling Championship with Brad Gushue. There, the pair had a strong showing, finishing the round robin with a 7–2 record. They then faced Switzerland in the qualification game which they won by stealing the extra end, thanks to a near impossible shot made by Einarson in the eighth end. They then lost to Scotland in the semifinal and Sweden in the bronze medal game, settling for fourth place.

The Einarson rink had a slow start to the 2021–22 season, failing to win any of their first five tour events. Their best finish came at the 2021 Sherwood Park Women's Curling Classic where they lost in the final to Tracy Fleury. The team reached the quarterfinals of the 2021 Masters, however, then missed the playoffs at the 2021 National. At the 2021 Canadian Olympic Curling Trials, the team went through the round robin with a 4–4 record. This earned them a spot in the first tiebreaker, where they defeated Casey Scheidegger 8–6. They then faced Krista McCarville in the second tiebreaker, where they lost 4–3 and were eliminated. The team's next event was the 2022 Scotties Tournament of Hearts in Thunder Bay, Ontario. Through the round robin, the defending Scotties champions posted a perfect 8–0 record, earning a spot in the playoffs. They then lost in the seeding round to New Brunswick's Andrea Crawford, meaning they would have to win three straight games to defend their championship title. In the playoffs, the team won the 3 vs. 4 page playoff against Team Fleury and then defeated New Brunswick's Crawford in the semifinal to reach the Scotties final where they would face Northern Ontario's McCarville rink. After controlling the entire game, Team Einarson sealed the victory with a steal of one in the tenth end. With the win, they became just the fourth team to win three consecutive Scotties titles. They then went on to represent Canada at the 2022 World Women's Curling Championship, where they fared much better than in 2021. The team finished the round robin tied for second place with a 9–3 record, however, due to their draw shot challenge, finished third overall. This placed them in the qualification game where they defeated Denmark's Madeleine Dupont to advance to the semifinal. There, they took on South Korea's Kim Eun-jung. After taking control in the seventh end, South Korea stole the ninth and tenth ends to hand the Canadian team a 9–6 loss. They were able to rebound in the bronze medal game with an 8–7 victory over Sweden's Anna Hasselborg. Team Einarson wrapped up their season at the final two Slams of the season. At the 2022 Players' Championship, they made it all the way to the final where they were defeated by the Hasselborg rink. At the 2022 Champions Cup, the team secured their fourth Grand Slam title as a foursome with a 10–6 victory over Gim Eun-ji.

Personal life
Einarson is employed as a rehabilitation assistant at Betel Home Foundation, a personal care home. She is married to Kyle Einarson and has two children. Einarson's brother Kyle Flett was also a competitive curler, reaching the Manitoba junior men's provincial final against Daley Peters in 2005. In 2006 he died in a snowmobile accident and Einarson still wears a necklace with a photo of the two of them today. Einarson is Métis and the Manitoba Métis Federation sponsors the team, as of the 2021 season. Einarson was awarded the Tom Longboat Award in 2021, in recognition of Indigenous athletes' "outstanding contributions to sport in Canada". Her uncle is Greg McAulay.

Grand Slam record

Former events

Teams

References

External links

1987 births
Living people
Canadian women curlers
Curlers from Manitoba
People from Gimli, Manitoba
Canada Cup (curling) participants
Canadian women's curling champions
Sportspeople from Selkirk, Manitoba
Canadian mixed doubles curling champions
Canadian Métis people
Métis sportspeople